Polekhs are a subethnic group of Russians settled along the Desna River and Seym River and mixed with local populations of Belarusians and Lithuanians. Most of them retained the Russian Orthodox religion.

References

Russian sub-ethnic groups
Ethnic groups in Russia